Eloy Gaspar Ureta Montehermoso (December 12, 1892 – October 10, 1965) was a Peruvian army officer who led the Peruvian Armed Forces to victory in the Ecuadorian–Peruvian War of 1941. Ureta was born in Chiclayo, a city in northern Peru, and from 1909 to 1913 studied in the Chorrillos Military School. After taking studies in the Escuela Superior de Guerra (Superior School of War), he was sent to Europe for further military education. He ran in the presidential election of 1945, but was defeated by José Bustamante y Rivero. In 1946, Ureta was awarded the title of Grand Marshal of Peru.

Bibliography 
Eloy G. Ureta, Trayectoria de una vida, Editorial Jurídica, 1973
Eloy G. Ureta, Apuntes sobre una campaña, s/e, Madrid, 1953

References

1892 births
1965 deaths
Peruvian military personnel
People from Lambayeque Region
Marshals of Peru